GEHA (Government Employees Health Association) is a self-insured, not-for-profit association providing medical and dental plans to federal employees and retirees and their families through the Federal Employees Health Benefits (FEHB) program and the Federal Employees Dental and Vision Insurance Program (FEDVIP).

GEHA provides benefits to more than 2 million people worldwide.

The company currently offers traditional fee-for-service medical plan options with a preferred provider organization (PPO) along with a high deductible health plan (HDHP) that can be paired with a health savings account (HSA). On the dental side, GEHA offers two options under the Connection Dental Federal FEDVIP plan.

In 2006, the Office of Personnel Management (OPM) chose GEHA as one of a select number of companies to offer supplemental benefits to federal employees under the Federal Employee Dental and Vision Insurance Program (FEDVIP).

GEHA has two subsidiaries: GEHA Solutions and Surety Life. GEHA Solutions f/k/a PPO USA was formed in 1997 to market the following products outside federal markets: Connection Dental Network, Connection Vision powered by EyeMed, and Connection Hearing by HearPO. GEHA acquired Surety Life in 2012, giving GEHA flexibility to offer additional products to existing and new customers.

Company profile

History

GEHA traces its roots to 1937, when the Railway Mail Hospital Association was formed in Kansas City, Missouri, to help provide U.S. Railway Mail Service clerks with assistance for their medical expenses. Twenty years later, the company expanded its scope to offer health insurance benefits to federal employees and retirees from all agencies and branches of government. In 1964, the company officially became known as the Government Employees Hospital Association. In 2007, the organization changed its name to Government Employees Health Association.

GEHA was one of the first insurance carriers eligible to provide coverage to federal employees under the Federal Employees Health Benefits Act of 1959. The FEHBP contracts with several hundred health insurance plans to provide coverage for more than 8 million federal enrollees and dependents, including retirees.

Evolution of the company name
The company's name has changed six times since its founding in 1937:
1937: Railway Mail Hospital Association
1950: Postal Transport Hospital Association
1958: Federal Postal Hospital Association
1964: Federal Employees Hospital Association
1965: Government Employees Hospital Association
2007: Government Employees Health Association

Key people
These are the people who have served as GEHA's president over time:
1938-1948: Walter C. Tuchfarber
1948-1975: Charles L. Massie
1975-1988: Raymond E. Rowland
1988-1992: James R. Cantrell
1993–2015: Richard G. Miles
2015–2018: Julie Browne
2018–2021: Darren Taylor
2021-present: Arthur A. Nizza, DSW

Sponsorships
On March 4, 2021, GEHA and the Kansas City Chiefs of the National Football League announced GEHA had received naming rights to the Chiefs' stadium. It was renamed GEHA Field at Arrowhead Stadium.

References

External links
 Official Website

Insurance companies of the United States
Companies based in Missouri
American companies established in 1937
Health care companies established in 1937
Financial services companies established in 1937
Companies established in 1937
1937 establishments in Missouri
1937 establishments in the United States